Sandrino Braun-Schumacher (born 4 July 1988) is a German professional footballer who plays as a defensive midfielder for SC Freiburg II.

Personal life
Braun-Schumacher is married to Linda.

References

External links

1988 births
Living people
People from Lahr
Sportspeople from Freiburg (region)
German footballers
Footballers from Baden-Württemberg
Association football midfielders
Germany youth international footballers
3. Liga players
Regionalliga players
SC Freiburg players
SC Freiburg II players
Stuttgarter Kickers players
SC Pfullendorf players
Offenburger FV players
SC Preußen Münster players